Lippstadt station is a stop for long-distance services on the Mid-Germany Railway in the town of Lippstadt in the district of Soest, in the German state of North Rhine-Westphalia. It is on the Hamm–Warburg and the Munster–Warstein railways. Until 1979, the Rheda Railway also branched off to Rheda.

Services

Long-distance services
Since the revised timetable of December 2010, Lippstadt has been served once a day by an Intercity-Express (ICE) or Intercity (IC) service from Cologne to Munich and return and is served by occasional ICE or IC services from Cologne and Düsseldorf to Leipzig, Dresden and Berlin and return. Due to the lack of useful connections on the Mid-Germany Railway, Eurobahn runs a pair of trains as line RB89 in the early mornings and the late evening to and from Kassel-Wilhelmshöhe, which provide connections to trains to and from southern Germany.

Regional transport services

Lippstadt station is served by the NRW-Express at 2-hour intervals and the Ems-Börde-Bahn stopping service every 30 minutes. The NRW-Express is operated by DB Regio NRW and the Ems-Börde-Bahn is operated by Eurobahn (Keolis).

History

The main line between Hamm and Paderborn was opened on 4 October 1850 by the Royal Westphalian Railway Company (Königlich-Westfälische Eisenbahn, KWE). The extension to Warburg was opened in 1853. The line from Munster to Warstein was opened on 31 October 1883. The line to Rheda followed a few years later. Operations on the north-south route of the Westfälische Landes-Eisenbahn (Westphalian State Railway) between Münster and Warstein was closed in two stages for passenger services up to 1975. Today it is used purely as a freight line. In 1979, passenger services were finally closed to Rheda. This line is now abandoned and largely dismantled. The Lippstadt-Nord station on the line to Beckum/Neubeckum was completely demolished in 1987 (station building, freight shed, loading ramp, rail tracks) and only the now non-functional signal box, which was built in 1910, and the main track survive. The headquarters of the Westfälische Landes-Eisenbahn along with its local freight terminal and central workshop are also near the former Lippstadt-Nord station.

Connections
The station is located just south of central Lippstadt and the pedestrian zone. Opposite the station is the central bus station, where there is access to the city and regional bus lines, as well as to express bus line S60 to Warstein.

Station building
The station building is a functional building from the seventies. It houses a DB ticket office, a DB Service-Store, a bicycle parking facility, toilets and a fast food restaurant.

Access
The station has barrier-free access to platform 1 and the entrance building via ramps, platforms tracks 2 and 3 are accessible by lift. Platform 1 is equipped with a tactile guidance system for the visually impaired.

Regional transport association
The town of Lippstadt is part of the Verkehrsgemeinschaft Ruhr-Lippe (transport community of Westphalia-Lippe).

References

Railway stations in North Rhine-Westphalia
Railway stations in Germany opened in 1850
1850 establishments in Prussia
Buildings and structures in Soest (district)